Ferrysburg is a city in Ottawa County in the U.S. state of Michigan.  The population was 2,892 at the 2010 census.

Spring Lake Township borders the city on the north and east, though it is administratively autonomous. The village of Spring Lake is located to the southeast, on the opposite side of Spring Lake from Ferrysburg. The city of Grand Haven is located to the south, on the opposite side of the Grand River. Lake Michigan is to the west of the city.

US 31 passes north-south through the city and M-104 has its western terminus at US 31 in Ferrysburg.

History
Settlement in the area of Ferrysburg began in the 1830s by William Montague Ferry and his family.  It was platted in 1857.

Geography
The city is situated on the north side of the Grand River at its mouth on Lake Michigan. The harbor of Grand Haven and Spring Lake form the southern boundary of the city.

Demographics

2010 census
As of the census of 2010, there were 2,892 people, 1,287 households, and 809 families residing in the city. The racial makeup of the city was 95.8% White, 0.5% African American, 0.6% Native American, 0.6% Asian, 0.5% from other races, and 2.0% from two or more races. Hispanic or Latino of any race were 2.5% of the population.

There were 1,287 households, of which 24.3% had children under the age of 18 living with them, 50.4% were married couples living together, 9.7% had a female householder with no husband present, 2.7% had a male householder with no wife present, and 37.1% were non-families. 31.3% of all households were made up of individuals, and 13% had someone living alone who was 65 years of age or older. The average household size was 2.24 and the average family size was 2.79.

The median age in the city was 47.1 years. 20% of residents were under the age of 18; 6.7% were between the ages of 18 and 24; 20.2% were from 25 to 44; 33.1% were from 45 to 64; and 20% were 65 years of age or older. The gender makeup of the city was 46.5% male and 53.5% female.

2000 census
As of the census of 2000, there were 3,040 people, 1,315 households, and 853 families residing in the city. The racial makeup of the city was 96.35% White, 0.59% African American, 0.76% Native American, 0.89% Asian, 0.49% from other races, and 0.92% from two or more races. Hispanic or Latino of any race were 1.28% of the population.

There were 1,315 households, out of which 27.7% had children under the age of 18 living with them, 54.0% were married couples living together, 7.5% had a female householder with no husband present, and 35.1% were non-families. 29.5% of all households were made up of individuals, and 9.0% had someone living alone who was 65 years of age or older.  The average household size was 2.31 and the average family size was 2.86.

In the city, the population was spread out, with 22.7% under the age of 18, 7.3% from 18 to 24, 26.6% from 25 to 44, 29.1% from 45 to 64, and 14.2% who were 65 years of age or older.  The median age was 40 years. For every 100 females, there were 95.1 males.  For every 100 females age 18 and over, there were 95.5 males.

The median income for a household in the city was $53,622, and the median income for a family was $65,231. Males had a median income of $42,875 versus $27,270 for females. The per capita income for the city was $31,254.  About 1.3% of families and 3.5% of the population were below the poverty line, including 2.4% of those under age 18 and none of those age 65 or over.

Climate
This climatic region is typified by large seasonal temperature differences, with warm to hot (and often humid) summers and cold (sometimes severely cold) winters.  According to the Köppen Climate Classification system, Ferrysburg has a humid continental climate, abbreviated "Dfb" on climate maps.

References

External links
Ferrysburg, Michigan

Cities in Ottawa County, Michigan
1963 establishments in Michigan
Michigan populated places on Lake Michigan